Eas Mor (lower) is a waterfall on the Abhainn Ghil on the island of Islay, in Scotland. It lies on the west coast of The Oa peninsula north of Lower Killeyan.

See also
Waterfalls of Scotland

References

Waterfalls of Islay